The 43rd Annual Annie Awards honoring excellence in the field of animation of 2015 was held on February 6, 2016, at the University of California, Los Angeles's Royce Hall in Los Angeles, California, presenting in 36 categories. This year, a new category called Best Animated Feature — Independent was introduced.

Production categories
On December 1, 2015, the nominations for Annie Awards were announced. Inside Out earned the most number of nominations with 14, followed by The Good Dinosaur with 10. Minions earned seven nominations while Anomalisa, Shaun the Sheep Movie, and The Peanuts Movie each received five.

Individual achievement categories

Juried awards

Multiple awards and nominations

Films

The following films received multiple nominations:

The following film received multiple awards:

Television/Broadcast

The following television productions received multiple nominations:

The following television productions received multiple awards:

References

External links
 Complete list of 43rd Annual Annie Awards nominees
 Annie Awards 2016 at Internet Movie Database

2015
2015 film awards
Annie
Annie